Ján Vályi or János Vályi (22 September 1837 – 19 November 1911) was a Slovak Greek Catholic hierarch. He was the bishop of Slovak Catholic Eparchy of Prešov from 1883 to 1911.

Born in Vencsellő, Austrian Empire (present day – Hungary) in 1837, he was ordained a priest on 26 October 1865. He was appointed as the Bishop of Eparchy by the Holy See on 15 March 1883. He was consecrated to the Episcopate on 20 May 1883. The principal consecrator was Bishop Ivan Pasteliy, and the principal co-consecrator were Bishop Juraj Čásky and Bishop Lörinc Schlauch.

He died in Prešov on 19 November 1911.

References 

1837 births
1911 deaths
19th-century Eastern Catholic bishops
20th-century Eastern Catholic bishops
Slovak Greek Catholic bishops